Marcolino José Carlos Moco (Chitue, Ekunha, June 19, 1953) is an Angolan politician. He was the 3rd Prime Minister of Angola from December 2, 1992, until June 3, 1996. He served as the first Executive Secretary of the Community of Portuguese Language Countries, also known as the Lusophone Commonwealth.

Career
Moco was fired from his role by President José Eduardo dos Santos. Santos removed the entire cabinet alongside the Governor of the central bank in a bid to be seen as decisive. Moco was a member of the People's Movement for the Liberation of Angola (MPLA), the party of the President, which had been the ruling party until 1991, shortly before Moco became Prime Minister (with an interlude by a government of national unity, after which the MPLA again became the ruling party until the present).

CPLP
In July 1996, Moco became the first Executive Secretary of the Community of Portuguese Language Countries, a new international organization which Portugal and most of its former colonies, including Angola, joined. Moco's term as Executive Secretary ended in 2000.

Personal life
Moco's eldest son is Chilala Moco, a photographer based in Angola and Portugal.

References

Executive Secretaries of the Community of Portuguese Language Countries
1953 births
Living people
People from Huambo Province
Governors of Bié
Governors of Huambo
Prime Ministers of Angola
Youth and Sports ministers of Angola
MPLA politicians